The name Leon has been used for three tropical cyclones worldwide: one in the Philippines by PAGASA in the Western Pacific Ocean, and two in the Australian region.

In the Western Pacific:
 Tropical Storm Noul (2020) (T2011, 13W, Leon) – a weak, but deadly tropical cyclone that impacted central Vietnam, which had been affected by Tropical Storm Sinlaku more than one month earlier.

In the Australian region:
 Cyclone Leon-Hanitra (1989) – a powerful tropical cyclone in the south-west Indian Ocean stayed out at sea.
 Cyclone Leon–Eline (2000) – another powerful tropical cyclone which became the second longest-lasting tropical cyclone on record in the Southern Hemisphere.

Pacific typhoon set index articles
Australian region cyclone set index articles